Juan Carlos Zaldívar is a filmmaker and video artist who was born in Cuba. Zaldivar has lived in the United States of America since 1980 with directing credits including "90 Miles", which aired nationally on PBS/"P.O.V.", and was featured in the book Mining the Home Movie: Excavations in Histories and Memories.

Zaldivar also co-directed "Soldiers Pay" with Tricia Regan and "David O. Russell" as well as several award-winning short films. Zaldivar has taught as an adjunct faculty member at New York University and Miami International University of Art & Design.
Zaldivar completed both his BFA and a Masters of Fine Arts at New York University's Tisch School of the Arts, and also taught as adjunct faculty there.

Zaldivar started a film career as a sound editor and designer, and worked in Academy Nominated films such as Ang Lee's "Sense and Sensibility;" "On the ropes" and on HBO’s America Undercover, which garnered an Emmy nomination for Zaldivar.

Zaldivar has had video art works  screened at many festivals worldwide and broadcast on PBS, ABC, IFC, Showtime and WE and has received numerous grants and awards; served as a Juror for several mayor film festivals including the Sundance International Film Festival and is a Sundance Film Institute alumnus.

Zaldivar recently tenured with Doc Society (previously Britdoc Foundation) as the Outreach Director for Good Pitch Miami 2017; associate produced the theatrical feature doc "Buena Vista Social Club, Adios"; co-produced the VR film "A history of Cuban dance" (Sundance & SXSW 2016); is directing a second VR doc entitled "SwampScapes" with Elizabeth Miller and Kim Grinfeder and is producing Phonograph Films' first fiction feature film with development support from "La Biennale di Venezia College Cinema"  at the Venice Film Festival.

References

External links 
 90 Miles Official Site
 90 miles PBS Site
 

Cuban screenwriters
Cuban male writers
Male screenwriters
Cuban film directors
Cuban film producers
Living people
Year of birth missing (living people)